Penicillium daleae is a species of the genus of Penicillium which was isolated from soil under conifers in Poland.

See also
 List of Penicillium species

References 

daleae
Fungi described in 1927